The New Brunswick Junior Hockey League (NBJBHL) is a Canadian Junior ice hockey league in the Province of New Brunswick. The NBJHL is a member of Hockey New Brunswick and Hockey Canada.

History
The original New Brunswick Junior Hockey League folded in 2003. That league was formed in the 1980s from the five regional Jr. B leagues of New Brunswick when the New Brunswick Junior Hockey League folded in 1983.

In the summer of 2009, five teams (Blacks Harbour Silver Kings, Grand Lake Wild Moose, Moncton Vito's, Port City Ice Dawgs, Tri-County River Cats) formed a new Junior B league, the NBJBHL.

Tri-County River Cats won the first three (2010–12) league titles.

With the collapse of the New Brunswick Junior C Hockey League in 2011 Hampton Hurricanes joined the league which was reorganized as a mixed Junior B and Junior C circuit. It was renamed the New Brunswick Junior Hockey League (NBJHL) for the 2012–13 season. Junior C league winners compete at the Maritime-Hockey North Junior C Championship.

Expansion came for the 2013–14 with the addition of the Fundy Cobras and Kent Coyotes. A year late the league accepted another pair of new teams, the Sackville Storm and the Sunny Corner Thunder.

The 2015–16 season saw the league split into the Don Johnson division - with some interlocking games against the Island Junior Hockey League - and the Maritime-Hockey North division.

2012 Vito's 
In the Spring of 2012, the Moncton Vito's dropped the fifth game of the NBJBHL finals to Tri-County to give the River Cats their third straight provincial title. Just like in 2010, the River Cats declined the right to play for the Don Johnson Cup, the Atlantic Junior B Championship. The Vito's went in their place and after a 1-3-0 record in the round robin, advanced to the playoff rounds. In the semi-final, the Vito's defeated the 4-0-0 host St. John's Jr. Caps 5-4 in overtime. In the final, the Vito's defeated the 4-1-0 East Hants Penguins of the Nova Scotia Junior Hockey League 2-1 in overtime to become the first New Brunswick team to win the Atlantic Junior B championship in a decade and the first-ever from the new NBJBHL.

Teams

Former teams
Black Harbour Silver Kings (2009–10)
Fredericton Jr. Caps (2012–17)
Fundy Cobras (2013–15) 
Grand Lake Moose (2005–18)
Hampton Hurricanes (2011–15) - relocated and renamed Southern Sting
Miramichi River Maniacs (2010–11; 2012–13)
Cap-Pele Predators (2015–2020)
Port City Ice Dawgs (2009–15)
Sackville Storm (2014–15) 
Saint John Lancers (2011–12) 
Shediac Predators (2012–15) - relocated and renamed Cap-Pele Predators 
St. Andrews Whalers (2010–11)

Champions

Don Johnson Cup Atlantic Champions
2012 Moncton Vito's
2015 Moncton Vito's
2017 Cap-Pele Predators
2022 Kent Koyotes

Maritime-Hockey North Junior C Champions
2013 Hampton Hurricanes
2016 Western Valley Panthers
2017 Southern Sting
2019 Tri-County River Cats
2022 Western Valley Panthers

References

External links
 

Ice hockey leagues in New Brunswick
B